Boogaloo and Graham is a 2014 British short drama film directed by Michael Lennox and starring Martin McCann, Charlene McKenna, and Jonathan Harden. It was nominated for the Academy Award for Best Live Action Short Film at the 87th Academy Awards. It won the BAFTA Award for Best Short Film at the 68th British Academy Film Awards.

Cast
 Martin McCann as Father
 Charlene McKenna as Mother
 Jonathan Harden as Older Jamesy

References

External links
 

2014 films
2014 drama films
2014 short films
British drama short films
2010s English-language films
2010s British films